Vykuntam Prabhakar Chowdary is an Indian politician and a Member of Legislative Assembly from Anantapur, Andhra Pradesh, first elected in 2014. He is a member of the Telugu Desam Party.

Biography 
He was the Senior Leader of Telugu Desam Party. He Was a Municipal Chairman For Anantapur From 1995 -2000. He Worked as Telugu Desam Party Constituency Incharge For Anantapur Urban Assembly constituency. He Constested as MLA Candidate in 1999 For Constituency Anantapur Urban From Telugu Desam Party. And Also He Constested as Independent MLA Candidate in 2004 For the Constituency Anantapur Urban. elected in 2014 at the assembly general elections from the Anantapur urban constituency in Anantapur district. He later served as Member of the Legislative Assembly In 2019 He Contested From Anantapur Urban Constitunecy and he lost in 2019 General Elections and Now He is Working As TDP Constituency Incharge For Anantapur Urban Assembly constituency

He along with Nara Chandra Babu Naidu Worked in Andhra Pradesh Legislative Assembly

Vykuntam Prabhakar Chowdary is the chairman AWAY (Avoid Wildness and Yeastiness), a social and non-political organization India.

References

Living people
Andhra Pradesh MLAs 2014–2019
Telugu Desam Party politicians
People from Anantapur, Andhra Pradesh
Year of birth missing (living people)